Mahaban is a town and a nagar panchayat in Mathura district in the Indian state of Uttar Pradesh.

History
Mahaban is said to have been found by Nanda, the foster father and paternal uncle of Lord Krishna before Krishna's birth, it was then ruled by Yadavas. Mahavan is situated about six miles east of Mathura. It is also called Brihadvan, because it is the largest of all the forests. In fact this forest has three names: Mahavan, Gokul and Brihadvan.

Legends suggest that Krishna spent his childhood at Mahaban. Sacred temples of Mathuranath, Palace of Nanda (The Assi-Khamba) and Raman Reti (The play ground of Krishna) still exist here.

Mahaban was sacked by Mahmud of Ghazani in 1017 CE. During this invasion the prince of Mahaban, Kulchand killed himself and his family to avoid capture. From there the invading forces moved to Mathura. Later it was also invaded by Iltutmish, Shah Jahan and Ahmed Shah Abdali. Mahaban remained a pargana of Agra Subah during the Mughal rule. It became the hotspot of rebellions during reign of Emperor Shahjahan and Aurangjeb. During the later half of 17th century Mahaban along with Sadabad, Nauh, Jalesar and Khandoli parganas was occupied by the rebel chief Nandram Thenua of Jawar. Mahaban later became part of Kingdom of Mursan under Raja Bahadur Puhup Singh. During 18th century it formed part of Bharatpur Kingdom. After the fall of Bharatpur it was occupied by Raja Dayaram of Hathras. After the Siege of Hathras(1818 ), Britisher took possession of Mahaban and made it part of Mathura district. During the revolt of 1857, the Jats of Mahaban revolted against the British Empire.

Geography
It has an average elevation of 176 metres (577 feet).

Demographics
 India census, Mahaban has a population of 8,608. Males constitute 54% of the population and females 46%. Mahaban has an average literacy rate of 39%, lower than the national average of 59.5%: male literacy is 51%, and female literacy is 25%. In Mahaban, 20% of the population is under 6 years of age.

References

Cities and towns in Mathura district